Sariz may refer to:
Sariz, Iran (disambiguation)
 Sarız, Turkey